William Bowie Stewart Campbell Sawers (1844 – 19 May 1916) was a Scottish-born Australian politician. Born in Stirlingshire in Scotland, where he was educated, he migrated to Australia in 1865, becoming a grazier with large holdings. In 1885 he was elected to the New South Wales Legislative Assembly as the member for Bourke, holding the seat until 1886; later, in 1898, he was elected to the seat of Tamworth. In 1901 he resigned from the Legislative Assembly in order to contest the first federal election as the Protectionist candidate for New England; he won narrowly. He was defeated in 1903 by a Free Trade candidate. Sawers died in 1916.

References

 

1844 births
1916 deaths
Protectionist Party members of the Parliament of Australia
Members of the Australian House of Representatives for New England
Members of the Australian House of Representatives
Members of the New South Wales Legislative Assembly
20th-century Australian politicians